Brisbane is the capital and most populous city of Queensland, and the third-most populous city in Australia and Oceania with a population of approximately 2.6 million. Brisbane lies at the centre of South East Queensland, which includes several other regional centres and cities. Brisbane is located in the hilly floodplain of the Brisbane River Valley between Moreton Bay and the Taylor and D'Aguilar mountain ranges. It sprawls across several local government areas, most centrally the City of Brisbane. The demonym of Brisbane is Brisbanite.

The city is also called Meanjin, the Aboriginal name referring to land on which parts of the city are built.  Aboriginal groups claiming traditional ownership of the area include the Yugara, Jagera, Turrbal and Quandamooka peoples.
 Brisbane occupies the land of a number of Aboriginal language groups, primarily the Yugara language group which includes the Turrbal language.

The Moreton Bay penal settlement was founded in 1824 at Redcliffe as a place for secondary offenders from the Sydney colony, and soon moved to North Quay in 1825 on the banks of the Brisbane River, so named for Sir Thomas Brisbane. German Lutherans established the first free settlement of Zion Hill at Nundah in 1838, and in 1859 Brisbane was chosen as Queensland's capital when the state separated from New South Wales. By the late 19th century, the city had grown into a major port and centre of immigration. During World War II, the Allied command in the South West Pacific was based in the city, along with the headquarters for General Douglas MacArthur of the United States Army.

Brisbane is classified as a global city, and is a major centre of research and innovation in the Asia-Pacific, particularly in medicine and biotechnology. A transport hub, Brisbane is served by large rail, bus and ferry networks, as well as Brisbane Airport and the Port of Brisbane, Australia's third-largest seaport.

A diverse city with over 32% of its metropolitan population being foreign-born, Brisbane is frequently ranked highly in lists of the most liveable cities. Galleries and museums are an important part of the city's culture, with the most prominent being the Queensland Art Gallery and Gallery of Modern Art. Brisbane has hosted major events including the 1982 Commonwealth Games, World Expo 88, the 2014 G20 summit, and will host the 2032 Summer Olympics and Paralympics.

Brisbane is a popular tourist destination. Major landmarks and attractions include South Bank Parklands, the City Botanic Gardens, King George Square and City Hall, the Story Bridge, the Mount Coot-tha Botanic Gardens and Lookout and the Lone Pine Koala Sanctuary.

Name
Brisbane is named after the Brisbane River, which in turn was named after Sir Thomas Brisbane, the governor of New South Wales from 1821 to 1825. The name is derived from the Scottish Gaelic "bris", meaning "to break or smash" and the Old English word "ban" meaning "bone".

Popular nicknames for the city include "Brissie", "Brisvegas" and the "River City". An historic nickname for Brisbane was "Queen City".

Modern-day Brisbane sits on land known also as Meanjin, the name used in the Turrbal language of one group of traditional owners. Meanjin means "place shaped as a spike", referencing the shape of the Brisbane River along the area that Brisbane CBD now straddles.

History

Pre-colonisation 

Aboriginal Australians lived in coastal South East Queensland for at least 22,000 years, with an estimated population between 6,000 and 10,000 individuals before European settlement in the 1820s. Aboriginal groups claiming traditional ownership of the area include the Yugara, Turrbal and Quandamooka peoples. A website representing a Turrbal culture organisation claims that historical documents suggest that the Turrbal peoples were the only traditional owners of Meanjin when British settlers first arrived.

Archaeological evidence suggests frequent habitation around the Brisbane River, and notably at the site now known as Musgrave Park. The rivers were integral to life and supplied an abundance of food included fish, shellfish, crab, and prawns. Good fishing places became campsites and the focus of group activities. The district was defined by open woodlands with rainforest in some pockets or bends of the Brisbane River.

Being a resource-rich area and a natural avenue for seasonal movement, Meanjin and the surrounding areas acted as a way station for groups travelling to ceremonies and spectacles. The region had several large (200–600 person) seasonal camps, the biggest and most important located along waterways north and south of the current city heart: Barambin or "York's Hollow" camp (today's Victoria Park) and Woolloon-cappem (Woolloongabba/South Brisbane), also known as Kurilpa. These camping grounds continued to function well into colonial times, and were the basis of European settlement in parts of Brisbane.

18th and 19th centuries

In 1770, British navigator James Cook, sailed through South Passage between the main offshore islands leading to the bay, which he named after James Douglas, 14th Earl of Morton, misspelled as "Moreton".

Matthew Flinders initially explored the Moreton Bay area on behalf of the British authorities. On 17 July 1799, Flinders landed at present-day Woody Point, which he named "Red Cliff Point" after the red-coloured cliffs visible from the bay.

In 1823 the Governor of New South Wales, Sir Thomas Brisbane, gave instructions for the development of a new northern penal settlement, and an exploration party led by John Oxley further explored Moreton Bay in November 1823.

He also named it after the Governor of the time. Oxley also recommended Red Cliff Point for the new colony, reporting that ships could land at any tide and easily get close to the shore. The convict settlement party landed in Redcliffe on 13 September 1824 formally establishing the Moreton Bay Penal Settlement that would become Brisbane. The party was under the command of Lieutenant Henry Miller and consisted of 14 soldiers (some with wives and children) and 29 convicts. The newly selected Brisbane region was plagued by mosquitoes at the time.

After visiting the Redcliffe settlement, Sir Thomas Brisbane then travelled  up the Brisbane River in December 1824. Governor Brisbane stayed overnight in a tent and often landed ashore, thus bestowing upon the future Brisbane City the distinction of being the only Australian capital city visited by its namesake. Chief Justice Forbes gave the new settlement the name of "Edenglassie" before it was named "Brisbane".

The penal settlement under the control of Captain Patrick Logan (Commandant from 1826 to 1830) flourished, with the numbers of convicts increasing dramatically from around 200 to over 1,000 men. He developed a substantial settlement of brick and stone buildings, complete with school and hospital. He formed additional outstations and made several important journeys of exploration. Logan became infamous for his extreme use of the cat o' nine tails on convicts. The maximum allowed limit of lashes was 50; however, Logan regularly applied sentences of 150 lashes.

During this period raids on maize fields were conducted by local Aboriginal groups in the Corn Field Raids of 1827-1828. These groups destroyed and plundered the maize fields in South Bank and Kangaroo Point, with the possible motive of extracting compensation from the settlers or warning them not to expand beyond their current area.

Between 1824 and 1842, almost 2,400 men and 145 women were detained at the Moreton Bay convict settlement under the control of military commandants. However, non-convict European settlement of the Brisbane region commenced in 1838 and the population grew strongly thereafter, with free settlers soon far outstripping the convict population. German missionaries settled at Zions Hill, Nundah as early as 1837, five years before Brisbane was officially declared a free settlement. The band consisted of ministers Christopher Eipper (1813–1894), Carl Wilhelm Schmidt, and lay missionaries Haussmann, Johann Gottried Wagner, Niquet, Hartenstein, Zillman, Franz, Rode, Doege and Schneider. They were allocated 260 hectares and set about establishing the mission, which became known as the German Station. Later in the 1860s many German immigrants from the Uckermark region in Prussia as well as from other German regions settled in the areas of Bethania, Beenleigh and the Darling Downs. These immigrants were selected and assisted through immigration programs established by John Dunmore Lang and Johann Christian Heussler and were offered free passage, good wages, and selections of land.

Scottish immigrants from the ship  arrived in Brisbane in 1849, enticed by Rev Dr John Dunmore Lang on the promise of free land grants. Denied land, the immigrants set up camp in York's Hollow waterholes in the vicinity of today's Victoria Park, Herston, Queensland. A number of the immigrants moved in and settled the suburb, naming it Fortitude Valley after the ship on which they arrived.

Free settlers entered the area from 1835, and by the end of 1840, Robert Dixon had begun work on the first plan of Brisbane Town, in anticipation of future development. The Roman Catholic church erected the Pugin Chapel in 1850, to the design by the gothic revivalist Augustus Pugin. Letters patent dated 6 June 1859, proclaimed by Sir George Ferguson Bowen on 10 December 1859, separated Queensland from New South Wales, whereupon Bowen became Queensland's first governor, with Brisbane chosen as the capital. Old Government House was constructed in 1862 to house Sir George Bowen's family, including his wife, the noblewoman Diamantina, Lady Bowen di Roma. During the tenure of Lord Lamington, Old Government House was the likely site of the origin of Lamingtons.

During the War of Southern Queensland, indigenous attacks occurred across the city, committing robberies and terrorising unarmed residents. "Reprisal raids" took place against the "Duke of York's clan" in Victoria Park in 1846 and 1849 by British soldiers of the 11th Regiment, however the clan had been wrongfully targeted as the attacks on Brisbane had not been committed by the Turrbal themselves but other tribes farther north. In 1855, Dundalli, a prominent leader during the conflict, was captured and executed by hanging at the present site of the GPO.

In 1864, the Great Fire of Brisbane burned through the central parts of the city, destroying much of Queen Street. The 1860s were a period of economic and political turmoil leading to high unemployment, in 1866 hundreds of impoverished workers convened a meeting at the Treasury Hotel, with a cry for "bread or blood", rioted and attempted to ransack the Government store.

The City Botanic Gardens were originally established in 1825 as a farm for the Moreton Bay penal settlement, and were planted by convicts in 1825 with food crops to feed the prison colony. In 1855, several acres was declared a Botanic Reserve under the Superintendent Walter Hill, a position he held until 1881. Some trees planted in the Gardens were among the first of their species to be planted in Australia, including the jacaranda and poinciana.

Charles Tiffin was appointed as Queensland Government Architect in 1859, and pursued an intellectual policy in the design of public buildings based on Italianate and Renaissance revivalism, with such buildings as Government House, the Department of Primary Industries Building in 1866, and the Queensland Parliament built in 1867. The 1880s brought a period of economic prosperity and a major construction boom in Brisbane, that produced an impressive number of notable public and commercial buildings. John James Clark was appointed Queensland Government Architect in 1883, and continuing in Tiffin's design for public buildings, asserted the propriety of the Italian Renaissance, drawing upon typological elements and details from conservative High Renaissance sources. Building in this trace of intellectualism, Clark designed the Treasury Building in 1886, and the Yungaba Immigration Centre in 1885. Other major works of the era include Customs House in 1889, and the Old Museum Building completed in 1891.

Fort Lytton was constructed in 1882 at the mouth of the Brisbane river, to protect the city against foreign colonial powers such as Russia and France, and was the only moated fort ever built in Australia.

The city's slum district of Frog's Hollow, named so for its location being low-lying and swampy, was both the red light district of colonial Brisbane and its Chinatown, and was the site of prostitution, sly grog, and opium dens. In 1888, Frog's Hollow was the site of anti-Chinese riots, where more than 2000 people attacked Chinese homes and businesses.

In 1893 Brisbane was affected by the Black February flood, when the Brisbane River burst its banks on three occasions in February and again in June in the same year, with the city receiving more than a year's rainfall during February 1893, leaving much of the city's population homeless. In 1896, the Brisbane river saw its worst maritime disaster with the capsize of the ferry Pearl, between the 80–100 people on board there were only 40 survivors.

20th century

When the colonies united in a federation in 1901, celebrations were held in Brisbane to mark the event, with a triumphal arch erected in Queen Street. In May that year, the Duke of Cornwall and York (later King George V) laid the foundation stone of St John's Cathedral, one of the great cathedrals of Australia. The University of Queensland was founded in 1909 and first sited at Old Government House, which became vacated as the government planned for a larger residence. Fernberg House, built in 1865, became the temporary residence in 1910, and later made the permanent government house.

In 1912, Tramway employees were stood down for wearing union badges which sparked Australia's first General strike, the 1912 Brisbane General Strike, which became known as Black Friday, for the savagery of the police baton charges on crowds of trade unionists and their supporters. In 1917, during World War I, the Australian Government conducted a raid on the Queensland Government Printing Office, with the aim of confiscating copies of Hansard that covered debates in the Queensland Parliament where anti-conscription sentiments had been aired.

Russian immigration took place in the years 1911–1914. Many were radicals and revolutionaries seeking asylum from tsarist political repression in the final chaotic years of the Russian Empire; considerable numbers were Jews escaping state-inspired pogroms. They had fled Russia via Siberia and Northern China, most making their way to Harbin, in Manchuria, then taking passage from the port of Dalian to Townsville or Brisbane, the first Australian ports of call.

Following the First World War, conflict arose between returned servicemen of the First Australian Imperial Force and socialists along with other elements of society that the ex-servicemen considered to be disloyal toward Australia. Over the course of 1918–1919, a series of violent demonstrations and attacks known as the Red Flag riots, were waged throughout Brisbane. The most notable incident occurred on 24 March 1919, when a crowd of about 8,000 ex-servicemen clashed violently with police who were preventing them from attacking the Russian Hall in Merivale Street, South Brisbane, which was known as the "Battle of Merivale Street".

Over 20 small municipalities and shires were amalgamated in 1925 to form the City of Brisbane, governed by the Brisbane City Council. A significant year for Brisbane was 1930, with the completion of Brisbane City Hall, then the city's tallest building and the Shrine of Remembrance, in ANZAC Square, which has become Brisbane's main war memorial.

These historic buildings, along with the Story Bridge which opened in 1940, are key landmarks that help define the architectural character of the city. Following the death of King George V in 1936, Albert square was widened to include the area which had been Albert Street, and renamed King George Square in honour of the King. An equestrian statue of the king and two Bronze Lion sculptures were unveiled in 1938.

In 1939, armed farmers marched on the Queensland Parliament and stormed the building in an attempt to take hostage the Queensland Government led by Labor Premier William Forgan Smith, in an event that became known as the "Pineapple rebellion".

During World War II, Brisbane became central to the Allied campaign, since it was the northernmost city with adequate communications facilities, when the AMP Building (now called MacArthur Central) was used as the headquarters for General MacArthur, until his headquarters were moved to Hollandia in August 1944. MacArthur had previously rejected use of the University of Queensland complex as his headquarters, as the distinctive bends in the river at St Lucia could have aided enemy bombers. Also used as a headquarters by the American troops during World War II was the T & G Building. About one million US troops passed through Australia during the war, as the primary co-ordination point for the South West Pacific. Wartime Brisbane was defined by the racial segregation of African American servicemen, prohibition and sly grog, crime, and jazz ballrooms.

In 1942, Brisbane was the site of a violent clash between visiting US military personnel and Australian servicemen and civilians, which resulted in one death and hundreds of injuries. This incident became known colloquially as the "Battle of Brisbane".

Post-war Brisbane had developed a "big country town" stigma, an image the city's politicians and marketers were very keen to remove. In the late 1950s, an anonymous poet known as The Brisbane Bard generated much attention to the city which helped shake this stigma. In 1955, Wickham Terrace was the site of a terrorist incident involving shootings and bombs, by the German immigrant Karl Kast. Despite steady growth, Brisbane's development was punctuated by infrastructure problems. The state government under Joh Bjelke-Petersen began a major programme of change and urban renewal, beginning with the central business district and inner suburbs. Trams in Brisbane were a popular mode of public transport until the network was closed in 1969, in part the result of the Paddington tram depot fire.

Between 1968 and 1987, Queensland was governed by Bjelke-Petersen, whose government was characterised by social conservatism, police corruption, and the brutal suppression of protest and has been described as a police state.
However, during this time Brisbane developed a counterculture focused on the University of Queensland, street marches and Brisbane punk rock music.

In 1971, the touring Springboks were to play against the Australian Rugby team. This was met with plans for protests due to the growing international and local opposition to apartheid in South Africa. However, before their arrival Bjelke-Petersen declared a state of emergency for a month, citing the importance of the tour. This did not stop the protest however with violent clashes between protestors and police erupting when several hundred demonstrators assembled outside a Brisbane motel on Thursday, 22 July 1971, where the Springbok team was staying. A second protest saw a large number of demonstrators assembled once more outside the Tower Mill Motel and after 15 minutes of peaceful protest, a brick was thrown into the motel room and police took action to clear the road and consequently disproportionate violence was used against demonstrators.

In the lead up to the 1980s Queensland fell subject to many forms of censorship. In 1977 things had escalated from prosecutions and book burnings, under the introduction of the Literature Board of Review, to a statewide ban on protests and street marches. In September 1977 the Queensland Government introduced a ban on all street protests, resulting in a statewide civil liberties campaign of defiance. This saw two thousand people arrested and fined, with another hundred being imprisoned, at a cost of almost five million dollars to the State Government. Bjelke-Petersen publicly announced on 4 September 1977 that "the day of the political street march is over ... Don't bother to apply for a permit. You won't get one. That's government policy now." In response to this, protesters came up with the idea of Phantom Civil Liberties Marches where protesters would gather and march until the police and media arrived. They would then disperse, and gather together again until the media and police returned, repeating the process over and over again.

The end of the Bjelke-Petersen era began with the Fitzgerald Inquiry of 1987 to 1989, a judicial inquiry presided over by Tony Fitzgerald investigating Queensland Police corruption. The inquiry resulted in the resignation of Premier Bjelke-Petersen, the calling of two by-elections, the jailing of three former ministers and the Police Commissioner Terry Lewis (who also lost his knighthood). It also contributed to the end of the National Party of Australia's 32-year run as the governing political party in Queensland.

In 1973, the Whiskey Au Go Go nightclub in the city's entertainment district, was firebombed that resulted in 15 deaths, in what is one of Australia's worst mass killings. The 1974 Brisbane flood was a major disaster which temporarily crippled the city, and saw a substantial landslip at Corinda. During this era, Brisbane grew and modernised, rapidly becoming a destination of interstate migration. Some of Brisbane's popular landmarks were lost to development in controversial circumstances, including the Bellevue Hotel in 1979 and Cloudland in 1982. Major public works included the Riverside Expressway, the Gateway Bridge, and later, the redevelopment of South Bank. Starting with the monumental Robin Gibson-designed Queensland Cultural Centre, with the first stage the Queensland Art Gallery completed in 1982, the Queensland Performing Arts Centre in 1985, and the Queensland Museum in 1986.

Brisbane hosted the 1982 Commonwealth Games and World Expo 88. These events were accompanied by a scale of public expenditure, construction, and development not previously seen in the state of Queensland. Brisbane's population growth far exceeded the national average in the last two decades of the 20th century, with a high level of interstate migration from Victoria and New South Wales. In the late 1980s Brisbane's inner-city areas were struggling with economic stagnation, urban decay and crime which resulted in an exodus of residents and business to the suburban fringe, in the early 1990s the city undertook an extensive and successful urban renewal of the Woolstore precinct as well as the development of South Bank Parklands.

21st century

Brisbane was impacted by major floods in January 2011 and February 2022. The Brisbane River did not reach the same height as the previous 1974 flood on either occasion, but caused extensive disruption and damage to infrastructure.

The Queensland Cultural Centre was also expanded, with the completion of the State Library and the Gallery of Modern Art in 2006, and the Kurilpa Bridge in 2009, the world's largest hybrid tensegrity bridge. Brisbane also hosted major international events including the final Goodwill Games in 2001, the Rugby League World Cup Final in 2008 and again in 2017, as well as the 2014 G20 Brisbane summit.

Population growth has continued to be among the highest of the Australian capital cities in the first two decades of the 21st century, and major infrastructure including the Howard Smith Wharves, Roma Street Parklands, Queens Wharf, the Brisbane Riverwalk, the Queen's Wharf casino and resort precinct, the Brisbane International Cruise Terminal, the Clem Jones, Airport Link, and Legacy Way road tunnels, and the Airport, Springfield, Redcliffe Peninsula and Cross River Rail railway lines have been completed or are under construction.

Brisbane will host the 2032 Summer Olympics and Paralympics.

Geography and environment

Brisbane is in the southeast corner of Queensland. The city is centred along the Brisbane River, and its eastern suburbs line the shores of Moreton Bay, a bay of the Coral Sea. The greater Brisbane region is on the coastal plain east of the Great Dividing Range, with the Taylor and D'Aguilar ranges extending into the metropolitan area. Brisbane's metropolitan area sprawls along the Moreton Bay floodplain between the Gold and Sunshine coasts, approximately from Caboolture in the north to Beenleigh in the south, and across to Ipswich in the south west.

Brisbane is sited on Meanjin land claimed by Aboriginal groups including the Turrbal peoples and Jagera people. The Brisbane River is a wide tidal estuary and its waters throughout most of the metropolitan area are brackish and navigable. The river takes a winding course through the metropolitan area with many steep curves from the southwest to its mouth at Moreton Bay in the east. The metropolitan area is also traversed by several other rivers and creeks including the North Pine and South Pine rivers in the northern suburbs, which converge to form the Pine River estuary at Bramble Bay, the Caboolture River further north, the Logan and Albert rivers in the south-eastern suburbs, and tributaries of the Brisbane River including the Bremer River in the south-western suburbs, Breakfast Creek in the inner-north, Norman Creek in the inner-south, Oxley Creek in the south, Bulimba Creek in the inner south-east and Moggill Creek in the west. The city is on a low-lying floodplain, with the risk of flooding addressed by various state and local government regulations and plans.

The waters of Moreton Bay are sheltered from large swells by Moreton, Stradbroke and Bribie islands, so whilst the bay can become rough in windy conditions, the waves at the Moreton Bay coastline are generally not surfable. Unsheltered surf beaches lie on the eastern coasts of Moreton, Stradbroke and Bribie islands and on the Gold Coast and Sunshine Coast to the north and south. The southern part of Moreton Bay also contains smaller islands such as St Helena Island, Peel Island, Coochiemudlo Island, Russell Island, Lamb Island and Macleay Island.

The city of Brisbane is hilly. The D'Aguilar National Park, encompassing the D'Aguilar Range, bounds the north-west of Brisbane's built-up area, and contains the taller peaks of Mount Nebo, Camp Mountain, Mount Pleasant, Mount Glorious, Mount Samson and Mount Mee. Other prominent rises in Brisbane are Mount Gravatt, Toohey Mountain, Mount Petrie, Highgate Hill, Mount Ommaney, Stephens Mountain, and Whites Hill, which are dotted across the city.

Much of the rock upon which Brisbane is located is the characteristic Brisbane tuff, a form of welded ignimbrite, which is most prominently found at the Kangaroo Point Cliffs at Kangaroo Point and the New Farm Cliffs on the Petrie Bight reach of the Brisbane River. The stone was used in the construction of historical buildings such as the Commissariat Store and Cathedral of St Stephen, and the roadside kerbs in inner areas of Brisbane are still manufactured of Brisbane tuff.

Ecology

Brisbane is located within the South East Queensland biogeographic region, and is home to numerous Eucalyptus varieties. Common trees in Brisbane include the Moreton Bay fig, an evergreen banyan with large buttress roots named for the region which are often lit with decorative lights in the inner city, as well as the jacaranda, a subtropical tree native to South America which line many avenues and parks and bloom with purple flowers during October. Other trees common to the metropolitan area include Moreton Bay chestnut, broad-leaved paperbark, poinciana, weeping lilli pilli and Bangalow palm. Some of the banks of the Brisbane River and Moreton Bay are home to mangrove wetlands.

Brisbane is home to numerous bird species, with common species including rainbow lorikeets, kookaburras, galahs, Australian white ibises, Australian brushturkeys, Torresian crows, Australian magpies and noisy miners. Common reptiles include common garden skinks, Australian water dragons, bearded dragons and blue-tongued lizards. Common ringtail possums and flying foxes are common in parks and yards throughout the city, as are common crow butterflies, blue triangle butterflies, golden orb-weaver spiders and St Andrew's Cross spiders. The Brisbane River is home to many fish species including yellowfin bream, flathead, Australasian snapper, and bull sharks. The waters of Moreton Bay are home to dugongs, humpback whales, dolphins, mud crabs, soldier crabs, Moreton Bay bugs and numerous shellfish species.

Climate

Brisbane has a humid subtropical climate (Köppen climate classification: Cwa/Cfa) with hot, wet summers and moderately dry, moderately warm winters. Seasonality is not pronounced, and average maximum temperatures of above  persist from October through to April.

Due to its proximity to the Coral Sea and a warm ocean current, Brisbane's overall temperature variability is somewhat less than most Australian capitals. Summers are long, hot, and wet, but temperatures only occasionally reach  or more.

On 19 July 2007, Brisbane's temperature fell below the freezing point for the first time since records began, registering  at the airport station.

Annual precipitation is ample. From November to March, thunderstorms are common over Brisbane, with the more severe events accompanied by large damaging hail stones, torrential rain and destructive winds. On an annual basis, Brisbane averages 124 clear days. Brisbane's wettest day occurred on 21 January 1887, when  of rain fell on the city, the highest maximum daily rainfall of Australia's capital cities. The wettest month on record was February 1893, when  of rain fell, although in the last 30 years the record monthly rainfall has been a much lower  from December 2010. Very occasionally a whole month will pass with no recorded rainfall, the last time this happened was August 1991. The city has suffered four major floods since its founding, in February 1893, January 1974 (partially a result of Cyclone Wanda), January 2011 (partially a result of Cyclone Tasha) and February 2022.

Brisbane is within the southern reaches of the tropical cyclone risk zone. Full-strength tropical cyclones rarely affect Brisbane, but occasionally do so. The biggest risk is from ex-tropical cyclones, which can cause destructive winds and flooding rains.

Urban structure

The Brisbane central business district (CBD, colloquially referred to as "the city") lies in a curve of the Brisbane river. Most central streets are named after members of the House of Hanover. Queen Street (named in honour of Queen Victoria) is Brisbane's traditional main street and contains its largest pedestrian mall, the Queen Street Mall. Streets named after female members (Adelaide, Alice, Ann, Charlotte, Elizabeth, Margaret, and Mary) run parallel to Queen Street and perpendicular to streets named after male members (Albert, Edward, George, and William).

The CBD's squares include King George Square, Post Office Square and ANZAC Square (home to the city's central war memorial).

Brisbane's metropolitan area is broadly and colloquially divided into the "northside" and the "southside", with the dividing line being the Brisbane River, as crossing one of the 15 bridges across the river is required to travel to the opposite side by land transport. This results in many areas which are south of the CBD being classified as located in the "northside", and vice versa, as a result of the river's winding trajectory. In addition to being classified as located on the "northside" or "southside" there are further broad and colloquial regions such as the "westside' for some areas to the southwest of the CBD and the "bayside" for areas located on the coast of Moreton Bay.

Like most Australian cities, Brisbane has a sprawling metropolitan area which takes in excess of one hour to traverse either north to south or east to west by car without traffic.

From the 1970s onwards, there has been a large increase in the construction of apartment developments, including mid-rise and high rise buildings, which has quickened in the 21st century. At the 2021 census, 73.4% of residents lived in separate houses, 14.7% lived in apartments, and 11.4% lived in townhouses, terrace houses, or semidetached houses.

Parklands

Brisbane's major parklands include the riverside City Botanic Gardens at Gardens Point, Roma Street Parkland, the 27-hectare Victoria Park at Spring Hill and Herston, South Bank Parklands along the river at South Bank, the Brisbane Botanic Gardens at Mount Coot-tha and the riverside New Farm Park at New Farm.

There are many national parks surrounding the Brisbane metropolitan area. The D'Aguilar National Park is a major national park along the northwest of the metropolitan area in the D'Aguilar Range. The Glass House Mountains National Park is located to the north of the metropolitan area in the Glass House Mountains and provides green space between the Brisbane metropolitan area and the Sunshine Coast. The Tamborine National Park at Tamborine Mountain is located in the Gold Coast hinterland to the south of the metropolitan area.

The eastern metropolitan area is built along the Moreton Bay Marine Park, encompassing Moreton Bay. Significant areas of Moreton, North Stradbroke and Bribie islands also covered by the Moreton Island National Park, Naree Budjong Djara National Park and the Bribie Island National Park respectively. The Boondall Wetlands in the suburb of Boondall include 1,100 hectares of wetlands which are home to mangroves and shorebirds as well as walking tracks.

Architecture

Brisbane has a number of heritage buildings, some of which date back to the 1820s, including The Old Windmill in Wickham Park, built by convict labour in 1824, which is the oldest surviving building in Brisbane, and the Commissariat Store on William Street, built by convict labour in 1828, which was originally used as a grainhouse, and is now the home of the Royal Historical Society of Brisbane and contains a museum. Other 19th and early 20th-century buildings of architectural significance include the Treasury Building, City Hall, Customs House, the Land Administration Building, MacArthur Chambers, The Mansions, the National Australia Bank Building and the Federation style People's Palace, a former temperance hotel on Edward Street.

Queenslander-style housing is common in Brisbane. Queenslander homes typically feature timber construction with large verandahs, gabled corrugated iron roofs, and high ceilings. Most of these houses are elevated on stumps (also called "stilts"), traditionally built of timber, which allow for a void under the houses which aids in cooling. The relatively low cost of timber in south-east Queensland meant that until recently, most residences were constructed of timber, rather than brick or stone.  Early legislation decreed a minimum size for residential blocks leading to few terrace houses being constructed in Brisbane.  The high-density housing that historically existed came in the form of miniature Queenslander-style houses which resemble the much larger traditional styles, but are sometimes only one-quarter the size.  These houses are most common in the inner-city suburbs.

Brisbane is home to several of Australia's tallest buildings. All of Brisbane's skyscrapers (buildings with a height greater than 150 metres) are located within the CBD, but the inner suburbs are also home to a number of high-density buildings. Brisbane's 91-metre City Hall was the city's tallest building for decades after its completion in 1930 and was finally surpassed in 1970, which marked the beginning of the widespread construction of high-rise buildings.

Brisbane's tallest building is currently Brisbane Skytower, which has a height of 270 metres. Architecturally prominent skyscrapers include the Harry Seidler-designed Riparian Plaza, One One One Eagle Street, which incorporates LED lighting resembling the buttress roots of the Moreton Bay fig, and 1 William Street, the executive headquarters of the Queensland Government.

Demographics

Brisbane's Greater Capital City Statistical Area includes the Local Government Areas of City of Brisbane, City of Ipswich, Moreton Bay Region, Logan City and Redland City, as well as parts of Lockyer Valley Region, Scenic Rim Region and Somerset Region, which form a continuous metropolitan area. The Australian Bureau of Statistics estimates that the population of Greater Brisbane is 2,560,720 as of June 2020, making it the third-largest city in Australia.

Ancestry and immigration

At the 2021 census, the most commonly nominated ancestries were: 

The 2021 census showed that 31.7% of Brisbane's inhabitants were born overseas and 52.2% of inhabitants had at least one parent born overseas. Brisbane has the 26th largest immigrant population among world metropolitan areas. Of inhabitants born outside of Australia, the five most prevalent countries of birth were New Zealand, England, India, Mainland China and the Philippines.

The areas of Sunnybank, Sunnybank Hills, Stretton, Robertson, Calamvale, Macgregor, Eight Mile Plains, Runcorn and Rochedale, are home to a large proportion of Brisbane's Mainland China, Taiwan and Hong Kong-born population, with Chinese being the most commonly-reported ancestry in each of these areas. The Vietnamese-born are the largest immigrant group in Inala, Darra, Durack, Willawong, Richlands and Doolandella. The Indian-born are the largest immigrant group in Chermside.

At the 2021 census, 3.0% of Brisbane's population identified as being Indigenous, which includes Aboriginal Australians and Torres Strait Islanders.

Language
At the 2021 census, 77.3% of inhabitants spoke only English at home, with the next most common languages being Mandarin (2.5%), Vietnamese (1.1%), Punjabi (0.9%), Cantonese (0.9%) and Spanish (0.8%).

Religion
At the 2021 census, the most commonly cited religious affiliation was "No religion" (41.4%).
Brisbane's most popular religion at the 2021 census was Christianity at 44.3%, the most popular denominations of which were Catholicism (18.6%) and Anglicanism (9.7%). Brisbane's CBD is home to two cathedrals – St John's (Anglican) and St Stephen's (Catholic).

The most popular non-Christian religions at the 2021 census were Hindu (2%), Buddhist (1.9%) and Muslim (1.8%).

Economy

Categorised as a global city, Brisbane is among Asia-Pacific cities with largest GDPs and is one of the major business hubs in Australia, with strengths in mining, banking, insurance, transportation, information technology, real estate and food.

Some of the largest companies headquartered in Brisbane, all among Australia's largest, include Suncorp Group, Virgin Australia, Aurizon, Bank of Queensland, Flight Centre, CUA, Sunsuper, QSuper, Domino's Pizza Enterprises, Star Entertainment Group, ALS, TechnologyOne, NEXTDC, Super Retail Group, New Hope Coal, Jumbo Interactive, National Storage, Collins Foods and Boeing Australia. Most major Australian companies, as well as numerous international companies, have contact offices in Brisbane.

Brisbane throughout its history has been one of Australia's most important seaport cities. The Port of Brisbane is located at the Brisbane River's mouth on Moreton Bay and on the adjacent Fisherman's Island, created by means of land reclamation. It is the 3rd busiest port in Australia for value of goods. Container freight, sugar, grain, coal and bulk liquids are the major exports. Most of the port facilities are less than three decades old and some are built on reclaimed mangroves and wetlands. The Port is a part of the Australia TradeCoast, which includes the Brisbane Airport along with large industrial estates located along both banks at the mouth of the Brisbane River.

White-collar industries include information technology, financial services, higher education and public sector administration generally concentrated in and around the central business district and satellite hubs located in the inner suburbs such as South Brisbane, Fortitude Valley, Spring Hill, Milton and Toowong.

Blue-collar industries, including petroleum refining, stevedoring, paper milling, metalworking and QR railway workshops, tend to be located on the lower reaches of the Brisbane River proximal to the Port of Brisbane and in new industrial zones on the urban fringe.

Tourism is an important part of the Brisbane economy, both in its own right and as a gateway to other areas of Queensland, as is international education, with over 95,000 international students enrolled in universities and other tertiary education institutions in the central City of Brisbane local government area alone in 2018.

Retail

Retail in the CBD is centred around the Queen Street Mall, which is Queensland's largest pedestrian mall. Shopping centres in the CBD include the Myer Centre, the Wintergarden, MacArthur Central and QueensPlaza, with the last of these along with Edward Street forming the city's focus for luxury brands. There are historical shopping arcades at Brisbane Arcade and Tattersalls Arcade. Suburbs adjacent to the CBD such as Fortitude Valley (particularly James Street), South Brisbane and West End are also a major inner-city retail hubs.

Outside of the inner-city, retail is focused on indoor shopping centres, including numerous regional shopping centres along with six super regional shopping centres, all of which are among Australia's largest, namely: Westfield Chermside in the north; Garden City (officially Westfield Mt Gravatt) in the south; Westfield Carindale in the east; Indooroopilly Shopping Centre in the west; Westfield North Lakes in the outer-north; and Logan Hyperdome in the outer-south. Brisbane's major factory outlet centres are the Direct Factory Outlets at Skygate and Jindalee.

The 100 hectare Brisbane Markets at Rocklea are Brisbane's largest wholesale markets, whilst smaller markets operate at numerous locations throughout the city including South Bank Parklands, Davies Park in West End, Queensland and the Eat Street Markets at Hamilton.

Culture and sport

Brisbane is home to several art galleries, the largest of which are the Queensland Art Gallery and the Queensland Gallery of Modern Art (GOMA), which is the largest modern art gallery in Australia. GOMA holds the Asia Pacific Triennial (APT) which focuses on contemporary art from the Asia and Pacific in a variety of media from painting to video work. In addition, its size enables the gallery to exhibit particularly large shows.

Dramatic and musical theatre performances are held at the multiple large theatres located at Queensland Performing Arts Centre (QPAC). The Brisbane Powerhouse in New Farm and the Judith Wright Arts Centre in Fortitude Valley also feature diverse programmes featuring exhibitions and festivals of visual art, music and dance. Brisbane is also home to numerous small theatres including the Brisbane Arts Theatre in Petrie Terrace, the La Boite Theatre Company which performs at the Roundhouse Theatre at Kelvin Grove, the Twelfth Night Theatre at Bowen Hills, the Metro Arts Theatre in Edward Street, and the Queensland Theatre Company's Bille Brown Theatre in West End.

The Queensland Performing Arts Centre (QPAC) at South Bank, consists of the Lyric Theatre, the Concert Hall, the Cremorne Theatre and the Playhouse Theatre and is home to the Queensland Ballet, Opera Queensland, the Queensland Theatre Company, and the Queensland Symphony Orchestra. The Queensland Conservatorium, a musical conservatorium in which professional music companies and conservatorium students also stage performances, is located within the South Bank Parklands. Numerous choirs present performances across the city annually. These choirs include the Brisbane Chorale, Queensland Choir, Brisbane Chamber Choir, Canticum Chamber Choir, Brisbane Concert Choir, Imogen Children's Chorale and Brisbane Birralee Voices.

Brisbane has maintained a constantly evolving live music scene, producing acts spanning genres including punk (see Brisbane punk rock), indie rock, electronic music, experimental music, noise rock, metal and post-punk. Brisbane's live music history is often intertwined with social unrest and authoritarian politics, as retold by journalist Andrew Stafford in Pig City: From The Saints to Savage Garden, Radical Brisbane: An Unruly History, edited by academics Raymond Evans and Carole Ferrier, and BNE – The Definitive Archive: Brisbane Independent Electronic Music Production 1979–2014, produced by record label director Dennis Remmer. There are also popular entertainment pubs and clubs within both the City and Fortitude Valley. The Brisbane Entertainment Centre at Boondall is an arena which hosts many musical concerts, with some of the largest being held at Lang Park.

Musicians from Brisbane include the Bee Gees (raised in Redcliffe and Cribb Island), Powderfinger (who met at Brisbane Grammar School and the University of Queensland), The Go-Betweens (after whom Brisbane's Go Between Bridge is named, and whose songs and albums, such as Spring Hill Fair, reflect the attitudes of 1980s Brisbane), The Veronicas (born and raised in Albany Creek), The Saints (based in Brisbane since 1974, one of the first punk rock bands), Savage Garden, Sheppard, Pete Murray, Ball Park Music, and TwoSet Violin. The city is featured in music including The Saints' "Brisbane (Security City)" (1978); The Stranglers' "Nuclear Device" (1979) about Joh Bjelke-Petersen; Midnight Oil's single "Dreamworld" (1987); and Powderfinger's album Vulture Street (2003).

Prominent writers from Brisbane include David Malouf (whose 1975 novel Johnno is set in Brisbane and at Brisbane Grammar School during World War II), Nick Earls (whose 1996 novel Zigzag Street is set at Zigzag Street in Red Hill), and Li Cunxin, author of Mao's Last Dancer and artistic director of the Queensland Ballet. Brisbane is a novel by Russian writer Yevgeny Vodolazkin. In the novel, the city serves as a metaphor of the promised land for the protagonist. The State Library of Queensland, the state's largest library, is located at the Queensland Cultural Centre.

Since the late 20th century, numerous films have been shot in Brisbane, and the popular children's animated television series Bluey was produced and set in Brisbane

Brisbane is home to over 6,000 restaurants and dining establishments, with outdoor dining featuring prominently. The most popular cuisines by number of dining establishments are Japanese, Chinese, Modern Australian, Italian, American, Indian, and Vietnamese. Moreton Bay bugs, less commonly known as flathead lobsters, are an ingredient named for the Brisbane region and which feature commonly in the city's cuisine, along with macadamia nuts, also native to the region.

Annual events

The Royal Queensland Exhibition (known locally as the Ekka), an agricultural exhibition held each August at the Brisbane Showgrounds in Bowen Hills, is the longest-running major annual event held in Brisbane. A public holiday is held for each local government area across Brisbane to enable widespread public attendance.

The Brisbane Festival is held each September at South Bank Parklands, the CBD and surrounding areas. It includes one of the nation's largest annual fireworks displays, called "Riverfire", which is attended by hundreds of thousands of residents.

The Brisbane International Film Festival (BIFF) is held in July/August each year in a variety of venues around Brisbane. BIFF features new films and retrospectives by domestic and international filmmakers along with seminars and awards.

The Buddha Birth Day festival at South Bank parklands attracts over 200,000 visitors each year, and is the largest event of its type in Australia.

There are also many smaller community events such as the Paniyiri Greek Festival (held over two days in May), the Brisbane Medieval Fayre and Tournament (held each June), the Bridge to Brisbane charity fun run, the Anywhere Festival and
the Caxton Street Seafood and Wine Festival.

Major events are often held at the 171,000 square metre Brisbane Convention & Exhibition Centre in South Brisbane.

Sport

Brisbane has hosted several major sporting events including the 1982 Commonwealth Games and the 2001 Goodwill Games, as well as events during the 1987 Rugby World Cup, 1992 Cricket World Cup, 2000 Sydney Olympics, 2003 Rugby World Cup, 2008 Rugby League World Cup, 2017 Rugby League World Cup and the 2018 Commonwealth Games. 
It will host the 2032 Summer Olympics and Paralympics.
It holds the Brisbane International tennis competition every year.

Rugby league is popular in Brisbane and the city hosts the Brisbane Broncos and Dolphins, who play in the National Rugby League competition and the Queensland Maroons who play in the State of Origin series.

In rugby union the city hosts the Queensland Reds who play in the Super Rugby competition.

Cricket is popular in the Brisbane and the city hosts the Brisbane Heat who play in the Big Bash League and the Queensland Bulls who play in the Sheffield Shield and the Ryobi One Day Cup.

Brisbane also hosts an A-League soccer team, the Brisbane Roar FC; an Australian Football League team, the Brisbane Lions; a basketball team, the Brisbane Bullets; a baseball team, the Brisbane Bandits; a netball team, the Queensland Firebirds; a field hockey team, the Brisbane Blaze; and water polo teams the Brisbane Barracudas and Queensland Breakers.

The city's major stadiums and sporting venues include the Gabba (a 42,000 seat round stadium at Woolloongabba), Lang Park (a 52,500 seat rectangular stadium at Milton also known by its corporate name Suncorp Stadium), Ballymore Stadium, the Queensland Sport and Athletics Centre, the Sleeman Centre (swimming), the State Tennis Centre, the Eagle Farm Racecourse and the Doomben Racecourse. The city is also home to numerous golf courses, with the largest being the Indooroopilly Golf Club at Indooroopilly, Queensland, the Brookwater Golf and Country Club at Brookwater, the Keperra Country Golf Club at Keperra and the Royal Queensland Golf Club at Eagle Farm.

In addition to its flagship sport franchises, Brisbane and its regions and suburbs have numerous teams in secondary leagues including the Intrust Super Cup, National Rugby Championship, Queensland Premier Rugby, National Premier League Queensland, National Basketball League, ANZ Championship, Australian Baseball League, Hockey One, National Water Polo League and F-League.

Tourism and recreation

Tourism plays a major role in Brisbane's economy, being the third-most popular destination for international tourists after Sydney and Melbourne. Popular tourist and recreation areas in Brisbane include the South Bank Parklands (including the Wheel of Brisbane), the City Botanic Gardens, Roma Street Parkland, New Farm Park, the Howard Smith Wharves, the Lone Pine Koala Sanctuary, the Teneriffe woolstores precinct, Fortitude Valley (including James Street and Chinatown), West End, City Hall (including the Museum of Brisbane), the Parliament of Queensland, the Story Bridge and bridge climb; St John's Cathedral, ANZAC Square and the Queensland Cultural Centre (including the Queensland Museum, Queensland Performing Arts Centre, Queensland Art Gallery, the Gallery of Modern Art and the State Library of Queensland), the Kangaroo Point Cliffs and park, and the Queensland Maritime Museum.

Brisbane is notable for its Brisbane Riverwalk network, which runs along much of the Brisbane River foreshore throughout the inner-city area, with the longest span running between Newstead and Toowong. Another popular stretch runs beneath the Kangaroo Point Cliffs between South Brisbane and Kangaroo Point. Several spans of the Riverwalk are built out over the Brisbane River. Other popular recreation activities include the Story Bridge adventure climb and rock climbing at the Kangaroo Point Cliffs.

Moreton Bay and its marine park is also a major attraction, and its three primary islands Moreton Island, North Stradbroke Island and Bribie Island, accessible by ferry, contain popular surf beaches and resorts. Tangalooma resort on Moreton Island is popular for its nightly wild dolphin feeding attraction, and for operating Australia's longest running whale watching cruises. The Fort Lytton National Park including a colonial defence fort and museum is also a historical bayside attraction. Beachside suburbs such as those on the Redcliffe Peninsula, as well as Shorncliffe, Sandgate, Wynnum, Manly and Wellington Point are also popular attractions for their bayside beaches, piers, and infrastructure for boating, sailing, fishing and kitesurfing.

The Mount Coot-tha Reserve, including Mount Coot-tha, the Mount Coot-tha Lookout, the Mount Coot-tha Botanic Gardens and the Sir Thomas Brisbane Planetarium is a popular recreational attraction for hiking and bushwalking.

There are many national parks surrounding the Brisbane metropolitan area which are popular recreational attractions for hiking and bushwalking. The D'Aguilar National Park runs along the northwest of the metropolitan area in the D'Aguilar Range, and contains popular bushwalking and hiking peaks at Mount Nebo, Camp Mountain, Mount Pleasant, Mount Glorious, Mount Samson and Mount Mee. The Glass House Mountains National Park is located to the north of the metropolitan area in the Glass House Mountains between it and that of the Sunshine Coast. The Tamborine National Park at Tamborine Mountain is located in the Gold Coast hinterland to the south of the metropolitan area. Moreton, North Stradbroke and Bribie islands are substantially covered by the Moreton Island National Park, Naree Budjong Djara National Park and the Bribie Island National Park respectively. The Boondall Wetlands in the suburb of Boondall are protected mangrove wetlands with floating walking trails.

Immediately to the south and north of Brisbane are the Gold Coast and Sunshine Coast respectively, which are home to several of Australia's most popular swimming and surfing beaches, and are popular day and weekend destinations for Brisbanites.

In 2015, a competition by travel guidebook Rough Guides saw Brisbane elected as one of the top ten most beautiful cities in the world, citing reasons such as "its winning combination of high-rise modern architecture, lush green spaces and the enormous Brisbane River that snakes its way through the centre before emptying itself into the azure Moreton Bay".

Governance

Unlike other Australian capital cities, a large portion of the greater metropolitan area, or Greater Capital City Statistical Area (GCCSA) of Brisbane is controlled by a single local government area, the City of Brisbane, which is the largest local government area (in terms of population and budget) in Australia, serving more than 40% of the GCCSA's population. The remainder of the metropolitan area falls into the LGAs of Logan City to the south, Moreton Bay Region in the northern suburbs, the City of Ipswich to the south west, Redland City to the south east, and into the Somerset, Scenic Rim and Lockyer Valley regions on the urban periphery. Several of these are also among the nation's most populous LGAs.

Each LGA is governed under a similar structure, including a directly elected mayor (including the Lord Mayor of Brisbane), as well as a council composed of councillors representing geographical wards. Brisbane City Hall is the seat of the Brisbane City Council, the governing corporation of the City of Brisbane LGA, and the bulk of its executive offices are located at the Brisbane Square skyscraper.

As the capital city of Queensland, Brisbane is home to the Parliament of Queensland at Parliament House at Gardens Point in the CBD, adjacent to Old Government House. Queensland's current Government House is located in Paddington. The bulk of the state government's executive offices are located at the 1 William Street skyscraper. The Queensland Supreme and District courts are located at the Queen Elizabeth II Courts of Law in George Street, while the Magistrates court is located at the adjacent Brisbane Magistrates Court building. The various federal courts are loced at the Commonwealth Law Courts building on North Quay.

The Australian Army's Enoggera Barracks is located in Enoggera, while the historic Victoria Barracks in Petrie Terrace now hosts a military museum. The Royal Australian Navy's HMAS Moreton base is located at Bulimba. The Royal Australian Air Force's RAAF Base Amberley is located in Amberley in the outer south-west of the metropolitan area.

Brisbane's largest prisons and correctional facilities, the Brisbane Correctional Centre, Brisbane Women's Correctional Centre, Arthur Gorrie Correctional Centre and Wolston Correctional Centre are located at Wacol, while the city's main historical prison, the Boggo Road Gaol, is now a museum.

Education

Brisbane hosts numerous university campuses.

Three major universities are headquartered in Brisbane, namely:
 The University of Queensland (UQ), which is Queensland's oldest university and frequently ranks among the world's top 50, with campuses in St Lucia, Herston and Gatton
 Queensland University of Technology (QUT), with campuses in the central business district (Gardens Point) and Kelvin Grove
 Griffith University (GU), with campuses in Nathan, Mount Gravatt, South Bank and Meadowbrook

Two other major universities, which are not headquartered in Brisbane, have multiple campuses in the Brisbane metropolitan area, namely:
 The University of Southern Queensland (USQ), with campuses in Springfield and Ipswich
 The University of the Sunshine Coast (USC), with campuses in Petrie and Caboolture

Other universities which have campuses in Brisbane include the Australian Catholic University, Central Queensland University and James Cook University.

Brisbane is a major destination for international students, who constitute a large proportion of enrolments in Brisbane's universities and are important to the city's economy and real estate market. In 2018, there were over 95,000 international students enrolled in universities and other tertiary education institutions in the central City of Brisbane local government area alone. The majority of Brisbane's international students originate from China, India and other countries in the Asia-Pacific region.

There are biotechnology and research facilities at several universities in Brisbane, including the Institute for Molecular Bioscience and CSIRO at the University of Queensland and the Institute of Health and Biomedical Innovation at Queensland University of Technology.

There are three major TAFE colleges in Brisbane; the Brisbane North Institute of TAFE, the Metropolitan South Institute of TAFE, and the Southbank Institute of TAFE. Brisbane is also home to numerous other independent tertiary providers, including the Australian College of Natural Medicine, the Queensland Theological College, the Brisbane College of Theology, SAE Institute, Jschool: Journalism Education & Training, JMC Academy, and American College and the Aboriginal Centre for the Performing Arts.

Many of Brisbane's pre-school, primary, and secondary schools are under the jurisdiction of Education Queensland, a branch of the Queensland Government. Independent (private), Roman Catholic and other religious schools also constitute a large share of Brisbane's primary and secondary schooling sectors, with the oldest such independent schools composing the memberships of the Great Public Schools Association of Queensland (GPS) for boys' schools and Queensland Girls' Secondary Schools Sports Association (QGSSSA) for girls' schools.

Infrastructure

Transport
Brisbane has an extensive transport network within the city, as well as connections to regional centres, interstate and to overseas destinations. Like all Australian cities, the most popular mode of transport is private car. Public transport is provided by rail, bus and ferry services and is co-ordinated by TransLink, which provides a unified ticketing and electronic payment system (known as "go card") for South East Queensland. The region is divided into seven fare zones radiating outwards from the Brisbane central business district (CBD), with Brisbane's built-up area falling within zones 1–3. Bus services are operated by public and private operators whereas trains and ferries are operated by public agencies. The CBD is the central hub for all public transport services with services focusing on Roma Street, Central and Fortitude Valley railway stations; King George Square, Queen Street and Roma Street busway stations; and North Quay, Riverside and QUT Gardens Point ferry wharves.

Roads

Brisbane is served by a large network of urban and inter-urban motorways. The Pacific Motorway (M3/M1) connects the inner-city with the southern suburbs, Gold Coast and New South Wales. The Ipswich Motorway (M7/M2) connects the inner-city with the outer south-western suburbs. The Western Freeway and Centenary Motorway (M5) connect the city's inner-west and outer south-west. The Bruce Highway and Gympie Arterial Road (M1/M3) connect the city's northern suburbs with the Sunshine Coast and northern Queensland. The Logan Motorway (M2/M6) connects the southern and south-western suburbs. The Gateway Motorway is a toll road which connects the Gold and Sunshine Coast. The Port of Brisbane Motorway links the Gateway Motorway to the Port of Brisbane. The Inner City Bypass and Riverside Expressway serve as an inner ring freeway system to prevent motorists from travelling through the city's congested centre.

Brisbane also has a large network of major road tunnels under the metropolitan area, known as the TransApex network, which include the Clem Jones Tunnel between the inner-north and inner-south, the Airport Link tunnel in the north-east and the Legacy Way tunnel in the south-west. They are the three longest road tunnels in Australia.

Bridges

The Brisbane River creates a barrier to road transport routes. In total there are sixteen bridges over the river, mostly concentrated in the inner city area. The road bridges (which usually also include provision for pedestrians and cyclists) by distance from the river mouth are the Sir Leo Hielscher Bridges, the Story Bridge, the Captain Cook Bridge, the Victoria Bridge, the William Jolly Bridge, the Go Between Bridge, the Eleanor Schonell Bridge, the Walter Taylor Bridge the Centenary Bridge and Colleges Crossing. There are three railway bridges, namely the Merivale Bridge, the Albert Bridge and the Indooroopilly Railway Bridge. There are also three pedestrian only bridges: the Goodwill Bridge, the Kurilpa Bridge and the Jack Pesch Bridge.

The Houghton Highway (northbound) and Ted Smout Memorial Bridge (southbound) bridges, over Bramble Bay between Brighton, Queensland and the Redcliffe Peninsula, are the longest bridges in the state. The abutment arches of the original crossing The Hornibrook Bridge still remain in place.

Rail

The Queensland Rail City network consists of 154 train stations along 13 suburban and interurban rail lines and across the metropolitan area, namely: the Airport, Beenleigh, Caboolture, Cleveland, Doomben, Ferny Grove, Ipswich/Rosewood, Redcliffe Peninsula, Shorncliffe, and Springfield lines, as well as the Exhibition line which is used only for events at the Brisbane Showgrounds, as well as an inner-city bypass for freight and a turnback for long-distance services. The network extends to the Gold and Sunshine coasts, which are fully integrated into the network on the Gold Coast line and Sunshine Coast line. The Airtrain service which runs on the Airport line is jointly operated between the City of Brisbane and Brisbane Airport.

55 million passenger trips were taken across the network in 2018–19.

Construction of the network began in 1865 and has been progressively expanded in the subsequent centuries. Electrification of the network was completed between 1979 and 1988.

The Cross River Rail project includes a twin rail tunnel ( long) which will pass under the Brisbane River to link two new railway stations at Albert Street in the CBD and Wooloongabba; it is under construction and scheduled to be completed in early 2025.

Bus
Brisbane has a large dedicated bus rapid transit network, the Brisbane busway network. The network comprises the South East Busway, the Northern Busway and the Eastern Busway. The main network hubs are the King George Square, Queen Street, and Roma Street busway stations.

There are also numerous suburban bus routes operating throughout the metropolitan area, including the high-frequency Blue and Maroon CityGlider routes which run between Newstead and West End (Blue), and Ashgrove and Coorparoo (Maroon) respectively.

Brisbane Metro is a proposed bus rapid transit (BRT) project which will initially consist of two routes (Metro 1 and 2) running between Eight Mile Plains and Roma Street, and UQ St Lucia (UQ Lakes) and the Royal Brisbane and Women's Hospital respectively.

Ferry

RiverCity Ferries operates three ferry services along the Brisbane River, CityCat, Cross River and CityHopper. Brisbane's ferries, and particularly its catamaran CityCats, are considered iconic to the city.

The CityCat high-speed catamaran ferry service, popular with tourists and commuters, operates services along the Brisbane River between the University of Queensland and Northshore Hamilton, with wharves at UQ St Lucia, West End, Guyatt Park, Regatta, Milton, North Quay, South Bank, QUT Gardens Point, Riverside, Sydney Street, Mowbray Park, New Farm Park, Hawthorne, Bulimba, Teneriffe, Bretts Wharf, Apollo Road and Northshore Hamilton.

The Cross River services operate smaller vessels for popular cross-river routes, namely: Bulimba–Teneriffe and Holman Street–Riverside.

The free CityHopper service operates smaller vessels along a route between North Quay and Sydney Street, stopping at South Bank, Maritime Museum, Riverside and Holman Street.

Pedestrian
An extensive network of pedestrian and cyclist pathways span the banks of the Brisbane River in the inner suburbs to form the Riverwalk network. In some segments, the Riverwalk is built over the river. The longest span of the Riverwalk connects Newstead in the east with Toowong in the west.

Airports

Brisbane Airport (IATA code: BNE, ICAO code: YBBN) is the city's main airport, the third busiest in Australia after Sydney Airport and Melbourne Airport. It is located north-east of the city centre on Moreton Bay and provides domestic and international passenger services. In 2017, Brisbane Airport handled over 23 million passengers. The airport is an hub for Virgin Australia as well as a number of minor and freight airlines, and a focus city for Qantas and Jetstar. The airport is served by the Airtrain service which runs on the Airport line, providing a direct service to the CBD.

Archerfield Airport in Brisbane's southern suburbs, Redcliffe Airport on the Redcliffe Peninsula and Caboolture Airfield in the far north of the metropolitan area serve Brisbane as general aviation airports.

Brisbane is also served by other major airports in South East Queensland, including Gold Coast Airport at Coolangatta, Sunshine Coast Airport at Marcoola and Toowoomba Wellcamp Airport at Wellcamp.

Seaport

The Port of Brisbane is located on the south side of the mouth of the Brisbane River on Moreton Bay and on the adjacent Fisherman's Island, an artificial island created by land reclamation. It is the third busiest port in Australia for value of goods. The port is the endpoint of the main shipping channel across Moreton Bay which extends 90 kilometres north near Mooloolaba. The port has 29 operating berths including nine deep-water container berths and three deep-water bulk berths as well as 17 bulk and general cargo berths.

There are two cruise ship terminals in Brisbane. Portside Wharf on the north side of the river at Hamilton is an international standard facility for cruise liners. Due to the height of the Gateway Bridge which must be passed to reach the terminal, the wharf services small and medium-sized cruise ships. The Brisbane International Cruise Terminal at Luggage Point in Pinkenba on the north side of the river opposite the Port of Brisbane is able to accommodate the largest cruise vessels in the world.

Healthcare

Brisbane is covered by Queensland Health's "Metro North", "Metro South" and "Children's Health Queensland" Hospital and Health Services. Within the greater Brisbane area there are eight major public hospitals, four major private hospitals, and numerous smaller public and private facilities. The Royal Brisbane and Women's Hospital and the Princess Alexandra Hospital are two of Queensland's three major trauma centres. Standing alone, they are the largest hospitals in Australia. The Princess Alexandra Hospital houses the Translational Research Institute (Australia) along with the state's renal and liver transplant services. The Royal Brisbane and Women's Hospital includes a specialist burns unit. The Prince Charles Hospital is the state's major cardiac transplant centre. Other major public hospitals include the Queensland Children's Hospital, the Queen Elizabeth II Jubilee Hospital, and the Mater Hospital.

Specialist and general medical practices are located in the CBD, and most suburbs and localities.

Brisbane is also home to the headquarters of the Queensland Ambulance Service central executive, located at the Emergency Services Complex Kedron Park, along with the headquarters of the Queensland Fire and Emergency Services and the Queensland Emergency Operations Centre.

Other utilities

Water storage, treatment and delivery for Brisbane is handled by Seqwater, which sells on to Queensland Urban Utilities (previously Brisbane Water) for distribution to the greater Brisbane area. Water for the area is stored in three major dams to the north-west of the metropolitan area: Wivenhoe, Somerset and North Pine.

There is an open market in relation to the supply of electricity and gas in Brisbane with the largest providers being Energex (electricity) and Origin Energy (gas).

Metropolitan Brisbane is serviced by all major and most minor telecommunications companies and their networks, including Telstra, Optus and Vodafone Australia.

Brisbane is home to numerous cemeteries including the following large 19th-century historical cemeteries: the 44-hectare Toowong Cemetery (the largest cemetery in Queensland, which is a popular destination for walkers and joggers), Balmoral Cemetery, Lutwyche Cemetery, Nudgee Cemetery, Nundah Cemetery and South Brisbane Cemetery.

Media

Print
The main local print newspapers of Brisbane are The Courier-Mail and its sibling The Sunday Mail, both owned by News Corporation. Brisbane also receives the national daily, The Australian, its sibling the Weekend Australian, as well as the Australian Financial Review. Sydney's The Sydney Morning Herald and Melbourne's The Age also sell in Brisbane in smaller numbers.

The Brisbane Times is Brisbane's second major local news source, owned by Nine, and is online only.

There are community and suburban newspapers throughout the metropolitan area, including Brisbane News and City News, many of which are produced by Quest Community Newspapers.

Television

Brisbane is served by all five major television networks in Australia, which broadcast from prominent television transmission towers on the summit of Mount Coot-tha. The three commercial stations, Seven, Nine, and Ten, are accompanied by two government networks, ABC and SBS. Channels provided by these networks include 10 HD (10 broadcast in HD), 10 Bold, 10 Peach, 10 Shake, TVSN, ABC TV HD (ABC TV broadcast in HD), ABC TV Plus/Kids, ABC ME, ABC News, SBS HD (SBS broadcast in HD), SBS World Movies, SBS Viceland HD (SBS Viceland broadcast in HD), SBS Food, NITV, SBS WorldWatch, 7HD (Seven broadcast in HD), 7two, 7mate, 7flix, 7mate HD (7mate broadcast in HD), Racing.com, 9HD (Nine broadcast in HD), 9Gem, 9Go!, 9Life, 9Gem HD (9Gem broadcast in HD) and 9Rush. 31 Digital, a community station, also broadcast in Brisbane until 2017. Optus and Foxtel operates Pay TV services in Brisbane, via cable and satellite means.

Radio
Brisbane is serviced by five major public radio stations including major commercial radio stations, including 612 ABC Brisbane (local news, current affairs and talk); ABC Radio National (national news and current affairs); ABC NewsRadio (national news); ABC Classic FM (classical music); Triple J (alternative music); and SBS Radio (multicultural broadcasting).

Brisbane is serviced by numerous major commercial and community radio stations including 4BC (local and national talk, news and current affairs); 4KQ (sport); 4BH (classic hits); KIIS 97.3 (pop); B105 (pop); Nova 106.9 (top 40); Triple M (rock); 96five Family FM (Christian/pop); Radio TAB (betting) and 4MBS (classical).

Brisbane is also serviced by community radio stations such as VAC Radio (Mandarin); Radio Brisvaani (Hindi); Radio Arabic (Arabic); 4EB (multiple languages); 98.9 FM (indigenous); 4RPH (vision impaired); Switch 1197 (youth broadcasting); 4ZZZ (community radio); and Vision Christian Radio (Christian). Additional channels are also available via DAB digital radio

See also
 Climate of Brisbane
 Culture of Brisbane
 Demographics of Brisbane
 Economy of Brisbane
 Geography of Brisbane
 History of Brisbane
 List of Brisbane suburbs
 List of museums in Brisbane
 List of tallest buildings in Brisbane
 List of people from Brisbane
 Sport in Brisbane
 Transport in Brisbane

Notes

References

External links
 City of Brisbane
 Official tourism website of Brisbane
 Official Tourism Board Brisbane Page – Tourism Australia
 Historical footage of Brisbane and Southern Queensland 

 
1824 establishments in Australia
Australian capital cities
Cities in Queensland
Coastal cities in Australia
Populated places established in 1824
Port cities in Queensland